614th may refer to:

Military units
614th (Devon) Fortress Company, Royal Engineers, a volunteer unit of Britain's Royal Engineers dating back to 1862
614th Air and Space Operations Center, a United States Air Force operations center
614th Radar Squadron, an inactive United States Air Force unit, last assigned to Cherry Point Marine Corps Air Station, North Carolina
614th Space Intelligence Squadron, unit located at Vandenberg AFB, California
614th Space Operations Squadron (614 SOPS) was a squadron of the United States Air Force (USAF) under Air Force Space Command (AFSPC)
614th Tactical Fighter Squadron, inactive United States Air Force unit
614th Tank Destroyer Battalion, tank destroyer battalion of the United States Army active during the Second World War

Other uses
614th, the cardinal for the ordinal 614 (number)
The 614th Commandment, propounded by Emil Fackenheim (1916–2003), noted Jewish philosopher and Reform rabbi

See also
Military topics
Ships
 , a post-Cold-War French navy ship with pennant D614, numbered 614
 , a Cold-War U.S. Navy submarine pennant SSN614, numbered 614
 , a post-WWII British Royal Navy ship with pennant K614, numbered 614
 , a WWI U.S. Navy speedboat pennat SP614, numbered 614
 , a post-WWII French navy submarine pennant S614, numbered 614
Squadrons
 No. 614 Volunteer Gliding Squadron RAF, British Royal Air Force unit
 No. 614 Squadron RAF, British Royal Air Force unit
Other topics
AD 614, the year 614 (DCXIV) of the Julian calendar
614 BC, the year

 614 (disambiguation)